Oberheim is an American synthesizer manufacturer founded in 1969 by Tom Oberheim.

History and products

Tom Oberheim founded the company in 1969, originally as a designer and contract manufacturer of electronic effects devices for Maestro (most notably the Maestro PS-1A Phase Shifter),, and briefly a retail dealer for ARP Instruments, eventually designing the company's first Oberheim-branded product, the Oberheim DS-2, one of the first digital music sequencers.

In 1975 Oberheim introduced the Synthesizer Expander Module (SEM) to complement the DS-2 sequencer and enable a user to play one synthesizer while the DS-2 played a sequence on another. The SEM featured a two-pole filter that could operate as a low-pass, high-pass, band-pass, or band-reject filter, giving it a different sound than the Moog and ARP filters popular at the time.

The company later combined multiple SEM modules with a digitally-scanned keyboard and a 2-channel voltage-controlled sequencer to create a series of polyphonic synthesizers, beginning with the 2-Voice, followed by the 4-Voice, and, in 1977, the 8-Voice which combined a 4-Voice with an external module of four additional SEMs. An optional programmer module, capable of storing and recalling 16 instances of some of the sound settings, was available for the 4-Voice and 8-Voice. These were among the first commercially-available polyphonic synthesizers.

In 1977, Oberheim introduced the monophonic OB-1, the world's first completely programmable synthesizer. In 1978-1981 it was followed by the polyphonic OB-X, OB-Xa and OB-SX. The final model of the series, OB-8, was released in 1983; it used digitally controlled oscillators to improve stability. The OB-series synthesizers replaced the relatively bulky SEMs with internal voice expansion cards which supported microprocessor control of synthesis parameters and also utilized common cabinetry and power supplies.

Oberheim introduced the Xpander in 1984, further expanding that product series with the Matrix-6 and the Matrix-12. The Matrix-1000, though bearing the Matrix name, was marketed after Oberheim was acquired by Gibson.

Oberheim drum machines 
Oberheim's DMX drum machine, a staple of early hip-hop music, lent its name to the Producer Davy DMX, electro musician DMX Krew, and is still used in dancehall reggae music.

Oberheim/Gibson

Oberheim Electronics declared bankruptcy in 1985 and was acquired by a group of lawyers who changed the name to Oberheim ECC. Following the acquisition, Tom Oberheim was creatively still at the helm of the company for a couple of years, before leaving to found Marion Systems. After a second bankruptcy in early 1988, Gibson Guitar Corporation, a larger musical instrument manufacturer (who, incidentally, also owned the Maestro brand), acquired Oberheim. Gibson, under the direction of Keith McMillen (who was Gibson's Vice President and Chief of R&D at the time), produced the Oberheim OB-Mx in collaboration with D.N. "Lynx" Crowe and Don Buchla; the Oberheim Echoplex Digital Pro in collaboration with Aurisis Research (Matthias Grob, Kim Flint, Eric Obermühlner); and re-released the Oberheim Strummer and Matrix 1000.

Oberheim/Viscount

The Oberheim trademark was later licensed to Viscount International, an Italian digital-organ producer. Viscount developed various instruments that were very innovative for the time and are still in demand: the Oberheim OB*12 analog modeling synthesizer, the GM-1000 guitar multi-effects unit, the MC series of master keyboards, and the OB32, a virtual tonewheel organ.

Tom Oberheim returns to the synthesizer market

In 2009, Tom Oberheim announced that he was manufacturing a new version of his classic analog SEM.

In 2011–2012, Tom Oberheim announced a four-voice SEM called "Son Of 4 Voice" (SO4V), as well as an updated version of the classic Two-Voice known as the Two-Voice Pro. The "Son Of 4 Voice" and the Two Voice Pro started shipping in 2014.

At the NAMM show of January 2016, Tom Oberheim announced the Dave Smith Instruments OB-6, a collaboration with Dave Smith resulting in Tom Oberheim's first voltage-controlled multi-voiced polyphonic synth since the mid-1980s; Tom Oberheim designed the VCO/VCF part replicating his SEM module, while control features, arpeggiator/step sequencer and effects processing were designed by Smith using his Prophet platform.

Oberheim trademark returned

In July 2019, JC Curleigh, CEO of Gibson, returned the Oberheim trademark and IP back to Tom Oberheim as "a gesture of goodwill to the musical instrument industry."

In May of 2022, the new Oberheim released the OB-X8, the company's first synthesizer in decades. As with the Sequential-made OB6, the OB-X8 was designed and built in collaboration with longtime friend Dave Smith, and it combines the original Oberheim's three signature OB polysynths-the OB-X, the OB-Xa and the OB-8-in a single unit.

Legacy

Both Marcus Ryle and Michel Doidic worked for Oberheim as instrument designers before helping develop the ADAT multitrack digital tape recorder for Alesis, (a 'prosumer' grade digital recording multitrack deck designed to compete with the Tascam DA series of digital multitracks) and then moving on to found Line 6 together.

See also
 Tom Oberheim
 E-mu Systems
 Gibson Guitar Corporation
 Viscount

References

External links

Oberheim Abbey Synthesizer Discussion Forum
Oberheim Zone at SynthZone.com
Oberheim overview at SynthSale
Viscount Italy main site
TomOberheim.com The new Oberheim site
Tom Oberheim NAMM Oral History Interview (2005)

Synthesizer manufacturing companies of the United States
Musical instrument manufacturing companies based in Los Angeles
Manufacturing companies based in San Francisco
Electronics companies established in 1969
Manufacturing companies established in 1969
1969 establishments in California